Razi (also Romanized as Razī) is a village in Hoseynabad Rural District, in the Central District of Shush County, Khuzestan Province, Iran. At the 2006 census, its population was 2,066, in 362 families.

References 

Populated places in Shush County